"Miss You" is a song by Belgian singer Jérémie Makiese. It was released as a single on 10 March 2022, with the official music video being released on the Eurovision Song Contest's YouTube channel.

Release 
The song was first released on 10 March 2022 on Belgian radio show Le 8/9, with the song eventually being played on Belgian TV channel La Une, and shortly after the Eurovision Song Contest's YouTube channel.

Eurovision Song Contest

Selection 
RTBF announced on 15 September 2021 that they had internally selected Jérémie Makiese to represent Belgium in the Eurovision Song Contest 2022; the first broadcaster to do so for the 2022 edition.

At Eurovision 
According to Eurovision rules, all nations with the exceptions of the host country and the "Big Five" (France, Germany, Italy, Spain and the United Kingdom) are required to qualify from one of two semi-finals in order to compete for the final; the top ten countries from each semi-final progress to the final. The European Broadcasting Union (EBU) split up the competing countries into six different pots based on voting patterns from previous contests, with countries with favourable voting histories put into the same pot. On 25 January 2022, an allocation draw was held which placed each country into one of the two semi-finals, as well as which half of the show they would perform in. Belgium was placed into the second semi-final, held on 12 May 2022, and performed 16th of the 18 countries in that show.

Charts

Weekly charts

Year-end charts

References 

2022 songs
2022 singles
Eurovision songs of Belgium
Eurovision songs of 2022
Ultratop 50 Singles (Flanders) number-one singles
Universal Music Group singles